The Saint Kitts and Nevis passport is issued to citizens of Saint Kitts and Nevis for international travel. Prior to 1983, Saint Kitts and Nevis, together with Anguilla, was an associated state of the United Kingdom. The passport is a Caricom passport as Saint Kitts and Nevis is a member of the Caribbean Community.

Citizenship by investment program

In 1984, Saint Kitts and Nevis introduced an immigrant investor program, Saint Kitts and Nevis is the most popular place to buy a passport; for $150,000 a family of four buy visa-free travel to 132 countries, with no requirement to live in or visit the country.  There is limited disclosure of financial information, and both income and capital gains are tax-free.

In May 2014, the Financial Crimes Enforcement Network issued a warning that St. Kitts and Nevis had granted passports to foreign individuals who have abused the Citizenship-by-Investment program sponsored "for the purpose of engaging in illicit financial activity."  In November 2014, Canada announced it was requiring St. Kitts citizens to obtain a visa from 22 November 2014, due to concerns about “identity management practices within its Citizenship by Investment program.” Following the announcement, the government of St. Kitts and Nevis initiated a recall on all biometric passports issued between January 2012 and July 2014, and replaced them with new passports which showed the holder's place of birth as well as any previous name changes. Any passports not returned by 31 January 2015 were cancelled by the government.

The investment program that offers St. Kitts and Nevis citizenship is one of the longest-standing programs. The country opened its doors to foreign investors in 1984. Since then, they have continued to offer their citizenship to those that are qualified and who have donated a significant amount of capital into the economy. St Kitts and Nevis also offers a fast-track service to clients, including the issuance of passports which previously had been subject to lengthy delays.

Visa requirements

 citizens of Saint Kitts and Nevis had visa-free or visa on arrival access (including eTAs) to 157 countries and territories, ranking the Saint Kitts and Nevis passport 25th in the world in terms of travel freedom according to the Henley Passport Index.

See also
CARICOM passport
Anguillan passport
Visa requirements for Saint Kitts and Nevis citizens

References

External links

 Citizenship by Investment from the Office of the Prime Minister of Saint Kitts and Nevis

Passports by country
Government of Saint Kitts and Nevis
Law of Saint Kitts and Nevis
Saint Kitts and Nevis and the Commonwealth of Nations